The Shuhada-e-Army Public School University of Technology (colloquially known as UOT) is a public university located in Nowshera, Khyber Pakhtunkhwa, Pakistan. It is the first public university in Nowshera District and also the first technical university in Khyber Pakhtunkhwa province.

Departments
The university consists of the following departments:

 Department of Electrical Engineering Technology
 Department of Electronics Engineering Technology
 Department of Mechanical Engineering Technology
 Department of Civil Engineering Technology
 Department of Information Engineering Technology
 Department of Energy Engineering Technology

Academic programs
Following degree programs are offered at the university:

 B.Sc. Electrical Engineering Technology
 B.Sc. Electronics Engineering Technology
 B.Sc. Civil Engineering Technology
 B.Sc. Mechanical Engineering Technology
 B.Sc. Information Engineering Technology
 B.Sc. Energy Engineering Technology

See also 
 Northern University, Nowshera
 Government Post Graduate College Nowshera
 National University of Technology, Islamabad
 Punjab Tianjin University of Technology, Lahore
 Mir Chakar Khan Rind University of Technology, Dera Ghazi Khan

References

External links
 UOT official website

Universities and colleges in Nowshera District
Educational institutions established in 2016
2016 establishments in Pakistan
Public universities and colleges in Khyber Pakhtunkhwa
Vocational education in Pakistan